Eudactylota diadota is a moth of the family Gelechiidae. It is found in North America, where it has been recorded from Arizona.

The wingspan is 9.5–12 mm. Adults are similar to Eudactylota iobapta, but there are pink scales on the costal margin of the forewings from the fascia to the apex.

References

Moths described in 1966
Gelechiini